Mats Johansson may refer to:

 Mats Johansson (footballer) (born 1962), Swedish footballer
 Mats Johansson (politician) (1951–2017), Swedish politician
 Mats Johansson (sailor) (born 1956), Swedish Olympic sailor
 Mats Johansson (skier) (born 1971), Swedish Olympic skier